Koonorigan (sometimes referred to as Konorigan) is a village in  northeastern New South Wales, Australia in the City of Lismore local government area.

Culture 
Koonorigan has a community hall, dating from at least 1931.

Notable people 
 Bruce Duncan, member of the NSW Legislative Assembly 1965 to 1988

References 

Lismore, New South Wales
Populated places in New South Wales